Hillside is a village in Cook County, Illinois, United States. As of the 2020 census it had a population of 8,320.

Geography
Hillside is located at  (41.874797, −87.900372).

History
German Lutheran immigrants planted farms and constructed Hillside's first school and church (Immanuel) near the intersection of Wolf and 22nd Street in the 1840s, which marked the start of the community's formal settlement. Although the majority of Hillside's later construction was located north of 12th Street, Immanuel Lutheran Church and School were incorporated inside village boundaries, giving Hillside its characteristic form.

However, Marion Covell found a significant limestone deposit just a few feet below the surface of his property during the 1850s, despite the fact that farming was the main industry at the time. The quarry he started in 1854 was still in operation until the middle of the 1970s, providing crushed stone for the construction of roads across the Chicago metropolitan area. The John Sexton Company purchased the quarry in 1979 and operated it as a sanitary landfill.

Cemeteries also took the place of active farming immediately beyond Hillside on its western and southern borders, first with Mt. Carmel in 1894, then Oak Ridge, Glen Oak, and ultimately Queen of Heaven in 1947. The Illinois Central Railroad station and the Chicago, Aurora & Elgin Railroad interurban's 12th Street spur made the cemetery easily accessible, which led to the development of taverns, restaurants, monument businesses, greenhouses, and flower stores. The Illinois Central Railroad station, known as Hillside because westbound trains had to ascend a slope at this location, served as the inspiration for the village's name when it was founded in 1905.

The community had its first significant residential growth during the 1920s when additional farmland was split up and sold. In the 1920s, there were substantial holdings obtained by St. Domitilla Roman Catholic Church and Mater Dolorosa Seminary. These institutions were formerly surrounded by open space, but following World War II, when Hillside's population quadrupled (from 1,080 to 2,131) between 1940 and 1950, then surged to 7,794 in 1960, it was submerged in a wave of residential building. Hillside Retail Mall, a pioneering regional shopping area, was next to the just finished Congress Expressway in 1956. Soon after, a Holiday Inn, Hillside Theaters, the High Point Tower office structure, and the industrial park on Fencl Lane surrounding the center.

Hillside Retail Center's heyday was brief due to the construction of newer, bigger malls and shopping complexes in the 1960s. The mall's deterioration was unaffected by changes to the exterior look of the building, its tenants, or its ownership. The majority of the mall was razed in 1997 to make room for a large auto dealership.

Demographics
As of the 2020 census there were 8,320 people, 2,744 households, and 1,660 families residing in the village. The racial makeup of the village was 42.92% African American, 21.19% White, 1.42% Native American, 3.06% Asian, 0.02% Pacific Islander, 19.09% from other races, and 12.30% from two or more races. Hispanic or Latino of any race were 35.55% of the population.

There were 2,744 households, out of which 33.35% had children under the age of 18 living with them, 39.69% were married couples living together, 14.47% had a female householder with no husband present, and 39.50% were non-families. 34.73% of all households were made up of individuals, and 16.84% had someone living alone who was 65 years of age or older. The average household size was 3.79 and the average family size was 2.80.

The village's age distribution consisted of 19.3% under the age of 18, 10.1% from 18 to 24, 25.6% from 25 to 44, 30.5% from 45 to 64, and 14.6% who were 65 years of age or older. The median age was 40.2 years. For every 100 females, there were 98.0 males. For every 100 females age 18 and over, there were 97.8 males.

The median income for a household in the village was $56,019, and the median income for a family was $76,548. Males had a median income of $45,093 versus $29,670 for females. The per capita income for the village was $25,953. About 4.0% of families and 5.5% of the population were below the poverty line, including 1.3% of those under age 18 and 6.4% of those age 65 or over.

Note: the US Census treats Hispanic/Latino as an ethnic category. This table excludes Latinos from the racial categories and assigns them to a separate category. Hispanics/Latinos can be of any race.

Government
Hillside is divided into three congressional districts. The area north of Harrison Street, and most of the area northeast of Roosevelt Road and Haase Avenue, is in Illinois's 7th congressional district; the southern arm of the city, south of Roosevelt Road along Wolf Road, is in the 3rd district; the area in between (primarily Mount Carmel Cemetery) is in the 4th district.

Education

Primary and secondary schools

Public schools
Hillside residents are served by various school districts for elementary and middle school .

Hillside School District 93 :
 Hillside Public School (Hillside)

Berkeley School District 87 :
 Sunnyside School (Berkeley)
 MacArthur Middle School (Berkeley)

Bellwood School District 88 :
 
 Lincoln Primary School (Bellwood)
 Lincoln Elementary School (Bellwood)
 Roosevelt Middle School (Bellwood)

All residents are served by Proviso Township High Schools District 209's Proviso West High School in Hillside, though qualified students may also attend the Proviso Mathematics and Science Academy in nearby Forest Park.

Hillside is also the home and birthplace of the famous rap group Do or Die.

Colleges and universities
Nearby colleges and universities include:
 
 Triton College (River Grove)
 College of DuPage (Glen Ellyn)
 Elmhurst University (Elmhurst)
 Dominican University (River Forest)

Business
Commercial Light Company, located at 245 Fencl Lane, is one of the village's largest employers.

Notable Cemeteries
Two notable cemeteries in Hillside. One is the Mount Carmel Cemetery. On the grounds of the cemetery are the graves of a number of organized crime figures, such as Al Capone and Dion O'Bannion. A number of Bishops and Archbishops of the Archdiocese of Chicago are buried in the Bishop's Mausoleum at Mount Carmel Cemetery. The other Catholic cemetery, Queen of Heaven Cemetery, is located immediately south of Mount Carmel, across Roosevelt Road.

Notable people

 Skip Pitlock, pitcher for the Chicago White Sox and San Francisco Giants; born in Hillside
 Al Capone, famous Chicago gangster in the 1930s, is buried at Mount Carmel a Chicago Archdiocese Cemetery in Hillside. His grave has become a tourist attraction.
 Dennis Farina, actor and police officer, is also buried at Mount Carmel.
 Emanuel "Chris" Welch, Speaker of the Illinois House of Representatives

References

External links

Village of Hillside official website

Villages in Illinois
Villages in Cook County, Illinois
Chicago metropolitan area
Majority-minority cities and towns in Cook County, Illinois